Intersection theory may refer to:

 Intersection theory, especially in algebraic geometry
 Intersection (set theory)